Jeep Jamboree: Off Road Adventure is a Game Boy racing video game that involves Jeep Wrangler vehicles. This game was later recycled for use in the video game Race Days (also for the Game Boy).

Gameplay

A first person perspective is used like in the game Test Drive and its sequels.

There are several options in the game including: difficulty level, whether to race in MPH or KM/H, steering ability, whether or not to have a track map, chevrons, and position flashing. The object is to race laps around a muddy race track while trying to get first place. There are twenty tracks to race in; each with a timer that forces the player to race fast. There is an option to either do a single race or a multi-race tournament against a computer opponent or through a human playing while using the Game Boy link cable and another copy of the video game. Items in the background like electric lines and rocks help provide a road-like feeling to the races.

In a single-player race, the player will race to the finish line against a field of approximately nineteen other drivers.

Reception
Allgame gave this video game a rating of 3 stars out of 5 in their review.

References

1992 video games
Game Boy-only games
Gremlin Interactive games
North America-exclusive video games
Off-road racing video games
Video games scored by Tommy Tallarico
Virgin Interactive games
Multiplayer and single-player video games
Game Boy games
Video games developed in the United Kingdom